The year 1874 in architecture involved some significant architectural events and new buildings.

Events
 George Devey begins to remodel Ascott House (near Wing, Buckinghamshire) in England.
 Eastern Parkway in Brooklyn, new York, laid out by Frederick Law Olmsted and Calvert Vaux, is completed.

Buildings and structures

Buildings completed
 California State Capitol in Sacramento, California, USA.
 Eads Bridge at St. Louis, USA, designed by James B. Eads.
 Grand Synagogue of Paris, France, designed by Alfred-Philibert Aldrophe.
 Palais Garnier (opera house), Paris, France, designed by Charles Garnier.
 St. Nicholas' Church, Hamburg, Germany, designed by George Gilbert Scott.
 Wahnfried, Richard Wagner's villa in Bayreuth, Germany.
 The Ancoats Hospital, an enlargement of the current building, in Manchester, designed by Lewis and Crawcroft, opens.
 Serbian Orthodox Cathedral in Sarajevo, designed by Andrey Damyanov

Awards
 RIBA Royal Gold Medal – George Edmund Street.
 Grand Prix de Rome, architecture: Benoît Édouard Loviot.

Births
February 12 – Auguste Perret, French architect, pioneer of reinforced concrete (died 1954)
March 10 – Karl Lindahl, Finnish-Swedish architect (died 1930)
April 11 – William Alexander Harvey, English architect of Bournville (died 1951)
April 24 – John Russell Pope, American architect (died 1937)
October 21 – Edwin Cooper, English architect (died 1942)

Deaths
January 13 – Victor Baltard, French architect (born 1805)
April 13 – James Bogardus, American inventor and architect (born 1800)
April 19 – Owen Jones, Anglo-Welsh architect (born 1809)
August 3 – Carl Tietz, German architect working in Vienna (born 1831)
September 3 – John Rennie the Younger, English civil engineer (born 1794)

References

Architecture
Years in architecture
19th-century architecture